Marek Oravec (born December 27, 1983) is an Austrian actor, living and working in London.

Career 
At the beginning of his career the actor was cast in three major roles at the Murau festival Shakespeare in Styria performed in English: In 2006 he was Caliban in a Nicholas Allen production of  The Tempest, in 2007 and in 2009 he performed the male leading roles in Romeo and Juliet and in Macbeth, both directed by Daniel Winder.

Since 2005, Oravec lives and works in London, Great Britain where he graduated from Drama Centre London. His debut in England was the title role in Goethe's Faust, directed by Cecil Hayter at the London Tabard Theatre. In 2011 he performed at the Royal National Theatre - in The Kitchen by Arnold Wesker, directed by Bijan Sheibani.

As well as regular roles in film productions, Oravec performs for British TV productions such as the action series Crossing Lines, the daily soap Doctors, the procedural comedy-drama New Tricks and the science fiction series Torchwood. Furthermore, he joined Anna Friel in the TV drama The Psychopath Next Door and went on to star in the hit Swedish drama Modus.

His feature film roles include appearances in Captain America as Jan, Fury and Our Kind of Traitor as Andrei.

Filmography 
 2008: Valkyrie
 2008: Londongrad (Shortfilm by Wilf Varvill) - Alexander Pilipenko
 2009: Jean Charles - Iatzek
 2011: Captain America: The First Avenger - Jan
 2011: National Theatre Live: The Kitchen - Hans
 2012: The Tragedy of Macbeth - Macbeth
 2013: Get Lucky - Niko
 2014: Fury - SS Officer
 2015: Modus (Swedish series) - Richard Forrester
 2016: Our Kind of Traitor - Andrei
 2018: The Guernsey Literary and Potato Peel Pie Society (film)

Award 
 2012 Best Feature Film Actor at the LA INDIE Film Festival (for the title role in The Tragedy of Macbeth)

External links 
 Marek Oravec, Website of the actor
 National Theatre, Short biography
 

1983 births
21st-century Austrian male actors
Austrian male stage actors
Living people
Austrian male film actors
Austrian male television actors
Austrian expatriates in England